Ivan Vida (born 14 March 1995) is a Croatian handball player for RK Nexe Našice and the Croatian national team.

He represented Croatia at the 2019 World Men's Handball Championship.

References

External links

1995 births
Living people
Croatian male handball players
Handball players from Zagreb
21st-century Croatian people